Katri (Kaija) Anna-Maija Helena Siren (née Tuominen; October 23, 1920 in Kotka – January 15, 2001) was a Finnish architect. She graduated as an architect from the Helsinki University of Technology in 1948. Siren designed most of her works together with her spouse to another Finnish architect, Heikki Siren.

She and her husband Heikki Siren set up their own architectural office in 1949. 
The Sirens worked together as architects their entire life. The Otaniemi Chapel is noted for its delicate balance between features of Finnish rural architecture and a modernism, influenced by Alvar Aalto's redbrick period of the 1950s. Their later work is noted for its monumentality.

She is buried in the Hietaniemi Cemetery in Helsinki.

Major works
 1954 Finnish National Theatre Small Stage, Helsinki, Finland
 1956 Otaniemi Chapel, Espoo, Finland
 1961 Orivesi Church, Orivesi, Finland
 1965 Kallio Municipal Offices, Helsinki, Finland
 1968 Ympyrätalo, Helsinki, Finland
 1970 Lauttasaari School, Helsinki, Finland
 1973 Brucknerhaus, Linz, Austria 
 1982 Graniittitalo, Helsinki, Finland
 1983 The Conference Palace in Baghdad, Iraq

Gallery of selected major works

References
 Bruun, Erik & Popovits, Sara (eds.): Kaija + Heikki Siren: Architects – Architekten – Architectes. Otava: Helsinki, 1977.

Notes

External links

 Everything and Nothing: Architects Kaija + Heikki Siren. Espoo City Museum.

1920 births
2001 deaths
People from Kotka
20th-century Finnish architects
Finnish women architects
Burials at Hietaniemi Cemetery